Savage's brook frog (Duellmanohyla lythrodes) is a species of frog in the family Hylidae found in Costa Rica and Panama. Its natural habitats are subtropical or tropical moist lowland forests and rivers. It is threatened by habitat loss.

References

Duellmanohyla
Amphibians of Costa Rica
Amphibians of Panama
Amphibians described in 1968
Taxonomy articles created by Polbot